Noclip is a crowdfunded media company dedicated to creating video game documentaries. It was founded by Danny O'Dwyer, an Irish video game journalist and documentary producer, in 2016, and is solely funded via Patreon donations.

History 
Prior to starting Noclip, O'Dwyer gained recognition through his work as a host and producer on the video game website GameSpot, where he hosted shows including Escape from Mount Stupid, Random Encounter, The Point and The Lobby. He was nominated as Trending Gamer of the Year at The Game Awards 2016.

On September 5, 2016, O'Dwyer created the YouTube channel for Noclip, releasing a trailer on September 12, 2016. In it, he says that "gamers deserve a media that reflects our passions, a press that uses its access to tell stories about how games get made, the people who play them, and the ways in which they affect our lives—stories that make us proud to be gamers." The company's name comes from "Noclip mode", a video game cheat that allows players to walk through walls. O'Dwyer said: "With [Noclip] we're going to walk through gaming's walls and take a peek at the other side."

O'Dwyer was inspired to use crowd-funding instead of the traditional advertising model of most video game websites because he believes that a focus on clicks has influenced the quality of games journalism. In a December 2016 video he said, "I want the only thing to matter about games coverage to be the quality of the videos, the quality of the work." Noclip was launched via a Patreon campaign and is supported solely through crowdfunding; in 2019 more than 5,000 patrons were donating over $23,000 USD per month.

Documentaries 
When filming documentaries, Noclip require that subjects have no control over the final documentary, giving the creators the ability to create a documentary free of the subject's influence. O'Dwyer takes a laid back approach when interviewing subjects, encouraging them to be relaxed and open up about the topic of discussion. Noclip documentaries do not run advertisements, with crowdfunding being the only source of income.

Noclip's first project provided viewers with insight into Rocket League – the game was chosen as a deliberate middle-point between large AAA studios and indie games. The second project covered a history of Doom, revealing some previously unreleased footage from Doom 4. Other documentary subjects have included Final Fantasy XIV, Horizon Zero Dawn, GOG.com, The Witcher 3: Wild Hunt, Astroneer, and the games of Bethesda Game Studios, Arkane Studios, Jonathan Blow, John Romero, and Brendan Greene.

References

External links

Crowdfunded web series
Documentary web series
YouTube channels launched in 2016
Gaming-related YouTube channels